Cummin Clancy (9 November 1922 – 15 February 2013) was an Irish athlete, educated at Glann National School. He competed in the 1948 Summer Olympics in the discus event. He later graduated from Villanova University in the U.S. and became a successful businessman  in New York City. He died in 2013, aged 90, at his home in Garden City, Nassau County, New York.

References

1922 births
2013 deaths
American businesspeople
Irish expatriates in the United States
Irish male discus throwers
Olympic athletes of Ireland
Athletes (track and field) at the 1948 Summer Olympics
People from County Galway